Athletics at the 1983 Mediterranean Games were held in Casablanca, Morocco.

Results

Men's events

Women's events

Medal table

References

External links
Complete 1983 Mediterranean Games Standings

Med
Athletics
1983